Dennis Randall Duron (born August 24, 1952) is a pastor and former American football player and coach. He played quarterback for the Louisiana Tech Bulldogs football team from 1970 to 1973, helping them win the 1973 Division II National Championships. 

Duron later served as the head football coach at Evangel University in Springfield, Missouri from 1977 to 1982. He is currently the chancellor at Evangel Christian Academy in Shreveport, Louisiana.

References

1952 births
Living people
American football quarterbacks
Birmingham Americans players
Birmingham Vulcans players
Evangel Crusaders football coaches
Louisiana Tech Bulldogs football players
People from Angleton, Texas
Players of American football from Texas